Broadcast Film Critics Association Awards 2010 may refer to:

 15th Critics' Choice Awards, the fifteenth Critics' Choice Awards ceremony that took place in 2010
 16th Critics' Choice Awards, the sixteenth Critics' Choice Awards ceremony that took place in 2011 and which honored the best in film for 2010